s-Heer Hendrikskinderen is a village in the municipality of Goes, about 2 km to the west of the city of Goes in the Dutch province of Zeeland.

History 
The village was first mentioned in 1267 as Ecclesiam Henrici, meaning "(private) church of Lord Henric", and is probably a reference to Henricus de Scinge. 's-Heer Hendrikskinderen is a circular village around a church which developed in the Late Middle Ages.

The Dutch Reformed church dates from the 15th century. The tower is probably incomplete. The current church was built in 1805. Castle Heer Hendriksburg used to be located near the village; in the 18th century, it was rebuilt as an inn, and was demolished in 1803.

's-Heer Hendrikskinderen was home to 137 people in 1840. It was a separate municipality until 1857, when it was merged into 's-Heer Arendskerke. In 1970, it became part of the municipality of Goes.

Gallery

References

Populated places in Zeeland
Former municipalities of Zeeland
Goes